The Intimate Stranger is a 1956 British film noir drama film directed by Joseph Losey (under the pseudonym Alec C. Snowden), and starring Richard Basehart, Mary Murphy, Constance Cummings and Roger Livesey. It was released in the U.S. as Finger of Guilt.

Plot
Reggie Wilson's Hollywood career as a film editor ended after he had an affair with his boss's wife. He then moved to England, became successful and married the daughter of a producer. They are both working on a new film called Eclipse. His new life is threatened when he starts receiving intimate letters from a woman. She reminds him of a relationship that they had some time ago, but  has no knowledge of it.

Cast
 Richard Basehart - Reginald "Reggie" Wilson
 Mary Murphy - Evelyn Stewart
 Constance Cummings - Kay Wallace
 Roger Livesey - Ben Case
 Faith Brook - Lesley Wilson
 Mervyn Johns - Ernest Chaple
 Vernon Greeves - George Mearns
 André Mikhelson - Steve Vadney
 David Lodge - Police Sergeant Brown
 Basil Dignam - Dr Gray
 Grace Denbigh Russell - Mrs Lynton
 Joseph Losey - Director
 Garfield Morgan - Waiter
 Marianne Stone - Miss Cedrick, the secretary
 Peter Veness - Policeman
 Frederic Steger - Barman
Director Joseph Losey appears in a small cameo part as a film director.

Production
Producer/director Joseph Losey, a communist who had been blacklisted in the United States and moved to the United Kingdom, is credited onscreen as Alec C. Snowden. The screenplay was written by fellow communist Howard Koch, who had also been blacklisted and wrote under the name of Peter Howard. The film, originally tiled With All My Heart, was produced at Shepperton Studios, where filming began in November 1955.

Reception
Allmovie wrote: "Perhaps Koch and his director Joseph Losey...were too drawn in to the plot's semi-metaphorical take on blacklisting to see that the scenes are not properly focused, the dialogue lacks enough sparkle and that the string of coincidences causes some plausibility problems. Fortunately, Finger is helped immensely by the on-target performance of leading man Richard Basehart and the beautifully wicked one of Mary Murphy, as well as the solid turn from Constance Cummings."

Derek Winnert wrote "It is one of the least well known of all Losey’s films, but then it is arguably also one of the least too, though far from negligible."

Dennis Schwartz noted a "tightly scripted crime thriller...The conclusion comes with a pat resolution, but by that time I was engrossed in the improbable story and too much impressed with the fine acting to care that much if I was being manipulated."

References

External links

1956 films
1956 drama films
1950s English-language films
Films directed by Joseph Losey
British drama films
1950s British films
British black-and-white films